Meli Malani (born 17 November 1996) is a Fijian swimmer. He competed in the men's 50 metre freestyle event at the 2016 Summer Olympics.

References

External links

1996 births
Living people
Fijian male swimmers
Olympic swimmers of Fiji
Swimmers at the 2016 Summer Olympics
Commonwealth Games competitors for Fiji
Swimmers at the 2014 Commonwealth Games
Swimmers at the 2014 Summer Youth Olympics
20th-century Fijian people
21st-century Fijian people